The Ekta Manch ('Unity Platform') is a political alliance in the Indian state of Uttar Pradesh. The alliance was announced in April 2014, ahead of the 2014 Indian general election. At the time it consisted of the Suheldev Bharatiya Samaj Party, the Quami Ekta Dal, the Janvadi Party and the Jan Adhikar Manch. The SBSP leader Om Prakash Rajbhar serves as convenor of the alliance.

References

Political parties in Uttar Pradesh
2014 establishments in Uttar Pradesh
Political parties established in 2014